The Groene Hart (English: Green Heart) is a relatively thinly populated area of the Netherlands covering much of the middle portion of the Randstad megalopolis. The major Dutch cities of Rotterdam, The Hague, Leiden,  Haarlem, Amsterdam and Utrecht surround this area. Cities inside the Groene Hart include Zoetermeer, Alphen aan den Rijn, Gouda, Woerden and the smaller cities of Schoonhoven, Oudewater, Haastrecht, Nieuwkoop, Montfoort, Waddinxveen, Bodegraven and Boskoop.

The Groene Hart is characterised by its rural character which contrasts the urban areas around it. Agriculture, nature and recreation are the primary activities in the Groene Hart. Residents and urban visitors can often find rest and many green spaces. Mills, dikes and Dutch cows are the primary landmarks of this lowland area. Thanks to the various separated cycle paths in the Groene Hart, the area can very well be explored by bike. The Groene Hart is of major importance to consolidate the number of Dutch meadow birds. The bird species black-tailed godwit, northern lapwing and Eurasian oystercatcher can all be found in the area.

History 
Since the Dutch Golden Age there has been a ring of cities surrounding a green and open central area. This area was given the nickname of "Groene Hart" by the middle of the twentieth century. The Groene Hart developed in the territory between the large cities in the Western Netherlands as an area of wet meadows and marshland. These wetlands were not suitable for building but instead were used for agriculture and peat production.

Geography 
The Groene Hart is a water-rich area, with bodies of water such as the Langeraarse Plassen, Nieuwkoopse Plassen, Reeuwijkse Plassen, Kagerplassen and Braassemermeer. In addition, rivers such as the Hollandse IJssel, Oude Rijn, Lek, Vlist, Loet, Rotte and Meije run through the area.

One of the European footpaths runs through the area. In the Netherlands this is known as the Floris V-pad, part of the Dutch LAW 1-3 path. Also the Limes (former northern border of the Roman empire in The Netherlands) is one of the historical topics included in the Groene Hart.

Government policy 
A government policy was adopted in 2003 to preserve the Groene Hart. It allows for the larger cities on the edge of the Groene Hart to build limited amounts of housing. The government also limits the establishment of greenhouses and other types of commercial buildings within the area.

The upcoming plan for the development of the Groene Hart includes four areas:

Around the outside of the Groene Hart is the Randstad ring of cities. This is an urban area that almost completely surrounds the Groene Hart.  Between these urban areas lie green environs that connect to other green sections of the Netherlands.
Connected to the Randstad Ring is an extended area with lots of water and forests. This is used for recreation and as a buffer against urban sprawl.
There will be four core areas for nature and water sports. There will be extended areas of bogs, marshes, and other types of wet forests. These four areas (De Venen, Krimpenerwaard, Vechtplassen and Hollandse Plassen) will be connected to each other with grassy berms.
Between the core areas and the outer areas will be pastures for nature, recreation and agriculture.

External links 
Groene Hart tourism and recreation (partially translated in multiple languages)
Programmabureau Groene Hart  (in Dutch)
Groenehart Archieven (in Dutch)
Van Randstad tot Delta Metropool (in Dutch)

Regions of the Netherlands
Regions of North Holland
Regions of South Holland
Regions of Utrecht (province)
Urban planning in the Netherlands